The Roman Catholic Diocese of Campina Grande is a suffragan Latin diocese in the Ecclesiastical province of Paraíba, in northeastern Brazil.

Its cathedral episcopal see is Catedral Nossa Senhora da Conceição, dedicated to the Immaculate Conception, in the city of Campina Grande.

It is vacant.

History 
 Established on May 14, 1949 as Diocese of Campina Grande, on territory split off from the  Archdiocese of Paraíba, its Metropolitan since.
 Lost territory on 1959.01.17 to establish the Diocese of Patos.

Statistics 
As per 2014, it pastorally served 807,000 Catholics (87.0% of 928,000 total) on 20,051 km² in 52 parishes with 92 priests (69 diocesan, 23 religious), 1 deacon, 131 lay religious (67 brothers, 64 sisters) and 25 seminarians.

Bishops
(all Latin Rite)

Episcopal ordinaries
 Suffragan Bishops of Campina Grande 
 Anselmo Pietrulla, Order of Friars Minor (O.F.M.) (born Poland) (1949.06.18 – 1955.05.11), next Bishop of Tubarão (Brazil) (1955.05.11 – retired 1981.09.17), died 1992; previously Apostolic Administrator of then Territorial Prelature of Santarem (Brazil, now a diocese) (1941 – 1947.12.13), Titular Bishop of Conana (1947.12.13 – 1949.06.18) as Bishop-Prelate of above Santarém (1947.12.13 – 1949.06.18), Apostolic Administrator of Territorial Prelature of Macapá (Brazil) (1949 – 1950.01.14)
 Otàvio Barbosa Aguiar (1956.02.24 – 1962.07.04) (first Brazilian incumbent), next Bishop of Palmeira dos Índios (Brazil) (1962.07.04 – retired 1978.03.29), died 2004; previously Titular Bishop of Gergis (1954.11.06 – 1956.02.24) as Auxiliary Bishop of Archdiocese of São Luís do Maranhão (Brazil) (1954.11.06 – 1956.02.24)
 Manuel Pereira da Costa (1962.08.23 – retired 1981.05.20), died 2006; previously Titular Bishop of Knin (1954.05.31 – 1959.06.20) as Auxiliary Bishop of Archdiocese of Paraíba (Brazil) (1954.05.31 – 1959.06.20), Bishop of Nazaré (Brazil) (1959.06.20 – 1962.08.23)
 Luís Gonzaga Fernandes (1981.07.09 – 2001.08.29), died 2003; previously Titular Bishop of Mididi (1965.11.06 – 1981.07.09) as Auxiliary Bishop of Archdiocese of Vitória (Brazil) (1965.11.06 – 1981.07.09)
 Matias Patrício de Macêdo (2001.08.29 – 2003.11.26), next Metropolitan Archbishop of Natal (Brazil) (2003.11.26 – 2011.12.21); previously Bishop of Cajazeiras (Brazil) (1990.07.12 – 2000.07.12), Coadjutor Bishop of Campina Grande (Brazil) (2000.07.12 – succession 2001.08.29)
 Jaime Vieira Rocha (2005.02.16 – 2011.12.21); previously Bishop of Caicó (Brazil) (1995.11.29 – 2005.02.16); next Metropolitan Archbishop of Natal (Brazil) (2011.12.21 – ...)
 Manoel Delson Pedreira da Cruz, Order of Friars Minor Capuchin (O.F.M.Cap.) (2012.08.08 - 2017.03.08), next Metropolitan Archbishop of Paraíba (Brazil) (2017.03.08 – ...); formerly Bishop of Caicó (Brazil) (2006.07.05 – 2012.08.08)
 Dulcênio Fontes de Matos (2017.10.11 - present); previously Titular Bishop of Cozyla as Auxiliary Bishop of Aracajú (in Sergipe) (2001.04.18 - 2006.07.12), Bishop of Palmeira dos Índios (in Alagoas) (2006.07.12 - 2017.10.11)

Coadjutor bishop
Matias Patrício de Macêdo (2001-2003)

Other priest of this diocese who became bishop
Genival Saraiva de França, appointed Bishop of Palmares, Pernambuco in 2000

See also 
 List of Catholic dioceses in Brazil

References

Sources and external links 
 GCatholic.org, with Google map and satellite photo - data for all sections
 Catholic Hierarchy

Roman Catholic dioceses in Brazil
Roman Catholic Ecclesiastical Province of Paraíba
Roman Catholic dioceses and prelatures established in the 20th century
Religious organizations established in 1949
1949 establishments in Brazil